Normunds Pūpols (born 5 October 1984 in Ventspils) is a Latvian high jumper.

He is a six-time Latvian champion in high jump and has a personal best of 2.28 metres, set in 2006.

Achievements

Personal bests

References

1984 births
Living people
Latvian male high jumpers
People from Ventspils
Competitors at the 2005 Summer Universiade
Competitors at the 2007 Summer Universiade
Competitors at the 2011 Summer Universiade